The 2012 Longines Royal International Horse Show was the 2012 edition of the Royal International Horse Show, the British official show jumping horse show at the All England Jumping Course at Hickstead. It was held as CSIO 5*.

The 2012 edition of the Royal International Horse Show was held between 19 and 22 July 2012. Different from other years, this year Royal International Horse Show only consist of Show jumping competitions.  Dressage competitions was not held because of the Equestrian competitions at the 2012 Summer Olympics just one week ahead.

FEI Nations Cup of the United Kingdom 
The 2012 FEI Nations Cup of the United Kingdom was part of the 2012 Royal International Horse Show. It was the seventh competition of the 2012 FEI Nations Cup.

The 2012 FEI Nations Cup of the United Kingdom was held on Friday 20 July 2012. The competing teams were: Great Britain, the Netherlands, Germany, Ireland, Sweden, France, Belgium and the Switzerland.

The competition was a show jumping competition with two rounds and optionally one jump-off. The height of the fences were up to 1.60 meters. The competition was endowed with 200,000 €.

(grey penalties points do not count for the team result)

The Longines King Georges V Gold Cup 
The King Georges V Gold Cup, the Show jumping Grand Prix of the 2012 Royal International Horse Show, was the major show jumping competition at this event. The sponsor of this competition was Longines. It was held on Sunday 22 July 2012. The competition was a show jumping competition with one round and one jump-off, the height of the fences were up to 1.60 meters.

It was endowed with 200,000 €.

(Top 5 of 47 Competitors)

References

External links 
 
 2012 results

Royal International Horse Show
Royal International Horse Show
Royal International Horse Show
Royal International Horse Show
Royal International Horse Show